Creos Luxembourg S.A. owns and manages electricity networks and natural gas pipelines in the Grand Duchy of Luxembourg. In this capacity, the company plans, constructs and maintains high, medium and low-voltage electricity networks and high, medium and low-pressure natural gas pipelines, which it owns or which it is responsible for managing.

History 
Creos was formed as a result of a merger between Cegedel S.A. – the Grand-Ducal electricity company of Luxembourg, which was founded in 1928 and at the time distributed 70% of the country's required electricity supply, Soteg S.A. – Luxembourg's primary gas supplier, and Saar Ferngas AG – a distribution company created in 1929 in Saarland. On 23 January 2009, all the shares from Cegedel S.A. and Saar Ferngas AG were transferred to Soteg S.A., which – after successfully launching a mandatory public bid for all shares not yet in its possession – underwent extensive restructuring with retrospective effect on 1 January 2009, giving rise to a new energy group. Named Enovos, it included the parent company Enovos International S.A. as well as two main subsidiaries: Creos (formerly Cegedel S.A.) in charge of network activities, and Enovos Luxembourg S.A. in charge of production, sales and marketing. Enovos and Creos each have a subsidiary to serve the German market: Enovos Deutschland and Creos Deutschland.

Over the next two years, Creos consolidated its position on the Luxembourg market. In 2010, it expanded its gas transmission network to include a distribution network and it purchased the natural gas networks from Luxgaz Distribution S.A., whereby the management of commercial activities was handed over to Enovos Luxembourg S.A. On 1 January 2011, the City of Luxembourg transferred its electricity and natural gas networks as well as its teams to Creos in exchange for a shareholding stake. The publicly owned shareholding thus rose from 5.71% to 24.57%. Besides its subsidiary in Germany, Creos also has a shareholding in the following companies: Luxmetering (the Interest Economic Group which pilots the smart metering network) since 2012, Balansys (joint-venture between Creos and Fluxys Belgium) and Ampacimon since 2015 and NEXXTLAB since 2018.

In order to more clearly distinguish the parent company from its subsidiaries – energy provider Enovos and grid operator Creos – Enovos International was given a new visual identity in 2016 and is now called Encevo. End July, private equity firm Ardian sold its stake up to 24.92 percent in Encevo to China Southern Power Grid International, the second grid operator in China and in the world.

Following a reorganization of the Encevo Group in Germany at the end of October 2021, Creos Luxembourg sold its stake in Creos Deutschland Holding GmbH.

Business sector 
Creos Luxembourg S.A. plans, constructs and maintains the electricity and natural gas transmission and distribution networks in the Grand Duchy of Luxembourg. Creos installs and manages the meters, processes the customer consumption data, invoices the network access charges and monitors the suppliers' movements and changes.

In Luxembourg, following the liberalisation of the energy markets, an independent organisation – the Luxembourg Institute of Regulation (ILR) – organises and supervises access to the networks. The tariffs are subject to its approval and it monitors the tolls invoiced to the users. The energy suppliers are thus guaranteed transparent access to Creos's networks.

Infrastructure

Electricity network 
The majority of the electric current in the Grand Duchy of Luxembourg comes from Germany via two double high-voltage 220,000 volt (220 kV) lines that are connected to the German network. The interconnection with the Belgian electricity market has become operational with the commissioning of a phase shifting transformer (PST) at the Schifflange Centre in October 2017, and around 15% of the energy fed into the network is produced locally (biogas, cogeneration, wind turbines, hydroelectricity and photovoltaics) The electricity is transmitted to the six transformer stations (Flebour, Roost, Itzig/Blooren, Heisdorf, Bertange and Schifflange) where the voltage is reduced from 220 to 65 kV before being distributed to industries and large municipal distribution networks. The voltage is then reduced from 65 kV to 20 kV in more than 60 transformer stations distributed across the whole country. The electric energy obtained is distributed to SMEs, towns and villages where the transformers reduce the current voltage to 0.4 kV before distributing it to the end consumer. A control centre, known as Electricity Dispatching, remotely controls and manages these high and medium-voltage networks.

The total length of the Luxembourg electricity network managed by Creos is 10,123 kilometres, including 593 kilometres of high-voltage lines, 3,702 kilometres of medium-tension lines and 5,828 kilometres of low tension lines.

Natural gas network 
Thanks to its entry points with Germany, Belgium and France, Luxembourg is linked to the interconnected gas networks throughout Europe. Monitored by Dispatching Gas, the high and medium-pressure pipelines carry the gas to sixty or so communes that are connected to the national gas network. Pressure-reducing stations that supply the local networks then reduce the gas pressure. Creos ensures the distribution of natural gas in 45 communes. 

Since 1 October 2015, Creos and its Belgian counterpart Fluxys Belgium, in collaboration with their respective regulators ILR and CREG, have merged the two national markets into one single Belux market. This integration, the first of its kind between two European Union member states, reflects the willingness of the European Union to create a borderless European gas market,,,. Balansys, the joint venture between Creos and its Belgian counterpart Fluxys, is the balancing operator in the Belux zone from 1 June 2020. In other words, it is responsible for ensuring that the gas market is well supplied, without one of the two suppliers having to pay an entry fee for its gas on the other's market.

Operation centres 
Creos has four regional centres, which are dedicated to building, operating, maintaining and repairing the electricity and natural gas networks.

The  Centre manages the central and northern regions. It covers the high, medium and low-voltage electricity services and the medium and low-pressure natural gas services, the central store and both the mechanical and electrical workshops,.

The Schifflange Centre covers the southern part of the country.

The Luxembourg City Centre, which covers the capital and the adjoining communes of Strassen and Hesperange, moved together with the Strassen headquarters to a new site in Merl at the end of 2021.

The Contern Centre manages and adjusts the meters, in particular smart meters.

Dispatching for electricity and natural gas together with the monitoring rooms for remote network control and management are installed at the Creos facility in Bettembourg since 2020.

Smart grids, electric mobility and energy management 
Creos is involved in three nationwide projects; smart grid, electro-mobility and energy management.

In accordance with the law of 7 August 2012 that transposes the European Energy Efficiency Directive into Luxembourg legislation, all the gas and electricity meters must be changed across the entire national territory, independently of the network operator. Creos has installed 300,000 smart meters that record detailed information on the consumption and production of energy throughout the entire territory of the Grand Duchy of Luxembourg, including 250,000 electricity meters and 50,000 gas meters. The installation of these new electricity and gas meters – called Smarty – in Luxembourg homes will enable the creation of networks with built-in real intelligence: smart grids. These smart grids are capable of monitoring decentralised electricity production (similarly to wind turbines and photovoltaic panels), directing the variations of the feeds into the distribution networks with greater precision and managing the isolated demand peaks linked with the charging of electric vehicles more effectively. The law from 7 August 2012 also stipulates that the metering system must be able to receive other vectors such as water and heating,,,,.

Creos is working towards the national electric vehicle objective that consists of installing 800 public charging stations for electric cars and hybrid plug-in cars across the country. Each charging station will incorporate two charging points, and the network – known as Chargy – will include 1,600 parking bays dedicated to electric vehicles. Creos will be responsible for the deployment, operation and maintenance of the public charging infrastructure on its distribution network, representing a total of 749 stations out of the 800 that are to be installed. In January 2021, Creos inaugurated the first two Superchargy ultra-fast charging terminals at Kirchberg, a district of Luxembourg City. By 2023, 88 SuperChargy direct current (DC) terminals will be extended along the country's main roads and motorways, as well in some Park & Ride (P&R) car parks, i.e. 19 locations in all.

Creos is also preparing the Third Industrial Revolution of the country. This convergence of IT, renewable energy and means of transport will have an impact on how the power grids are managed. To anticipate this evolution, the grid operator joined forces with Powerdale S.A. to create NEXXTLAB, an entity that aims to develop innovative solutions in the field of energy management in coordination with the widespread introduction of electro-mobility.

Notes and references 

Energy companies of Luxembourg